Nahid Rachlin (born 1950) is an Iranian-American novelist and short story writer. She has been called "perhaps the most published Iranian author in the United States".

Life
Nahid Rachlin was born June 6, 1950 in Abadan, Iran. Her father Manoochehr Bozorgmehri was a circuit judge, and her mother Mohtaram Bozorgmehri had ten children. Brought up by an aunt until she was nine years old, she then lived with her parents, who were emotionally distant, under the shadow of restrictive gender expectations. Her closest family relationship was with an older sister, Pari. Pari underwent arranged marriage to a physically abusive older man, and then lost access to her son after she sued for divorce. Pari remarried, but suffered episodes of mental breakdown for which she was institutionalised, and died young after a home accident.

 aged 17, Rachlin emigrated to the United States, gaining a BA at Lindenwood College. She married Howard Rachlin, a psychology professor, and in 1969 became a naturalized US citizen. In the early 1970s she pursued graduate study in creative writing, writing short stories for a class with Richard Humphries at Columbia University, and for a class with Donald Barthelme at City College of New York. These stories won her the Stegner Fellowship at Stanford University. In 1976 Rachlin returned to Iran for the first time in twelve years, drawing on the experience for her debut novel Foreigner.

Works
 Foreigner. New York: Norton, 1978.
 Married to a stranger. New York : Dutton, 1983.
 Veils: short stories. San Francisco: City Lights Books, 1992. 
 The heart's desire: a novel. San Francisco: City Lights Books, 1995.
 Jumping over fire. San Francisco: City Lights Books, 2005.
 Persian girls: a memoir. New York: Jeremy P. Tarcher, 2006.
 A way home: stories. Edmonds, Washington: Ravenna Press, 2018.

References

Further reading

External links
  nahidrachlin.com
 Interview with Nahid Rachlin

1946 births
Living people
People from Abadan, Iran
Iranian emigrants to the United States
American women novelists
American short story writers
American women short story writers
American novelists of Asian descent
American short story writers of Asian descent
Lindenwood University alumni
21st-century American women